is a Japanese professional muay thai kickboxer and former boxer. A professional competitor since 2011, Shiratori began his career as a muay thai fighter, most notably winning the WPMF Japan title in 2013. Following an unsuccessful two year boxing career, Shiatori transitioned to kickboxing. He was the 2019 RISE Lightweight champion and RISE World Series winner, as well as the 2021 Rizin KICK tournament winner.

Between July and November 2021 he was the #4 ranked bantamweight in the world according to Combat Press. Combat Press ranks him as the #5 super bantamweight kickboxer in the world. Shiratori was ranked as a top ten bantamweight by Combat Press between August 2019 and August 2020, peaking at #1 between April and August 2020. Combat Press furthermore ranked him as a top ten super bantamweight between September 2020 and March 2021, peaking at #1 in September and November 2020.

Muay thai career

Early career
Shiratori made his professional debut against Shogun at Muay Lok 2011 -1st- on February 20, 2011. He lost the fight by unanimous decision. His next two fights were likewise with Muay Lok, during which he defeated Piero Otsuka by unanimous decision at Muay Lok 2011 -2nd- on April 2, 2011, and Rukiya Anpo by unanimous decision at Muay Lok 2011 -3rd- on August 7, 2011.

Shiratori made his kickboxing rules debut against Takuya Saito at J-NETWORK J-FIGHT in SHINJUKU -vol.24- on February 19, 2012. Saito won the fight by knockout, stopping Shiratori with just 10 seconds left in the fight.

2012 Next Heroes Cup
Following his loss to Saito, Shiratori returned to muay thai. He was scheduled to fight Fumiya Iwashita at M-1 Muay Thai Challenge Sutt Yod Muaythai vol.1 Part 1 on March 25, 2012, in the semifinals of the 2012 Next Heroes Cup. Shiroatori notched his first stoppage victory, winning by a first-round technical knockout. Shiratori was next scheduled to face Yuta Tokuyama at Muay Lok 2012 -2nd- on June 17, 2012. Shiratori won the fight by a 35-second knockout. Shiratori faced Daichi Kurashina at REBELS 12 on July 29, 2012, in the finals of the 2012 Next Heroes Cup. He won the fight by unanimous decision, managing to knock Kurashina with a headkick in the third round, with scores of 29–27, 30-26 and 30–26.

Shiratori was scheduled to fight Takuro at Muay Lok 2012 -3rd- on October 10, 2021. Takuro snapped Shiratori's three fight winning streak with a second-round technical knockout.

Shiratori faced Em Rajasaklek at Muay Lok 2013 -ist- on April 28, 2013. The fight was ruled a draw, with one judge scoring the bout 30-29 for Shiratori, while the remaining two judges scored it 29-29.

After defeating Klasik Sitchansing by a first-round knockout in the fabled Lumpinee Stadium on August 10, 2013, Shiratori was scheduled to fight a rematch with Takuro at M-FIGHT The Battle of Muaythai II on August 9, 2013. The rematch went into an extra round, as the bout was ruled a draw following the first three rounds, after which Shiratori won by majority decision.

WPMF Super Featherweight champion
This two-fight winning streak earned Shiratori the chance to fight Takahito Fujimaki for the WPMF Japan Super Featherweight title at M-FIGHT The Battle of Muaythai III on December 1, 2013. Shiratori beat Fujimaki by unanimous decision.

Shiratori was scheduled to fight Seo Dong Pong at Muay Lok 2014 -1st- on April 27, 2014, in a non-title bout. Pong won the fight by a third-round technical knockout, dropping Shiratori three times inside of the first 48 seconds of the third round. Three months later, Shiratori was scheduled to fight another non-title bout against Tsuyoshi M16 Muaythaistyle at Muay Lok 2014 -2nd- on July 13, 2014. Tsuyoshi won the fight by a fourth-round technical knockout, after the ringside doctor stopped the fight due to a cut caused by an elbow.

Boxing career
Shiratori made his boxing debut against Nao Sugawara on May 6, 2015. He won the fight by knockout. Shiratori would go on to win eight of his next ten boxing matches, before challenging Izuki Tomioka for the Japanese Youth Lightweight. Tomioka successfully defended the title by unanimous decision.

Kickboxing career

Early RISE career
Shiratori transitioned to kickboxing in 2018, and signed with RISE. He was scheduled to make his promotional debut against Kazuma at RISE 125, on June 17, 2018. He won the fight by a first-round knockout, dropping Kazuma with a left straight at the very end of the round.

Shiratori was scheduled to face Masanori Shimada at RISE 127 on September 16, 2018. He won the fight by a first-round headkick knockout.

Shiratori faced Tomohiro Kitai at RISE 129 on November 17, 2018. Shiratori dominated the bout, scoring a single knockdown with a right straight in the second round. He won the fight by unanimous decision, with all three judges scoring the fight 30–26 in his favor.

Shiratori made his Rizin debut at Rizin - Heisei's Last Yarennoka! on December 31, 2018, when he faced Yoshiya Uzatsuyo. Shiratori won the fight by a third-round stoppage, knocking Uzatsuyo out with a well timed knee midway through the round.

RISE Lightweight champion

Shiratori vs. Hideki
His four fight winning streak earned Shiratori the right to fight Hideki for the vacant RISE Lightweight title, in the main event of RISE 130 on February 3, 2019. At the time that the bout was scheduled, Hideki was the #1 ranked contender in RISE lightweight rankings, while Shiratori was the #2 ranked contender. It was further announced that the newly crowned champion would be given a place in the 2019 RISE World Series.

Shiratori won the fight by a third-round technical knockout. Both fighters started out cautiously, spending the first two rounds exchanging low kicks and occasional jabs, with the rounds being scored as a draw. Midway through the third round, both fighters exchanged kicks, which resulted in cuts on the legs both. Shiratori suffered a slight cut on his knee, while Hideki suffered a deeper cut on his shin. Due to the depth of the cut, the ringside doctor opted to stop the fight. Shiratori was unsatisfied with how the fight ended, stating he would fight Hideki in his first title defense.

RISE World Series
Shiratori was scheduled to fight Hector Santiago in the first round of the 2019 RISE World Series on March 10, 2019. Prior to the beginning of the tournament, Shiratori stated his desire to fight Taiga Kawabe in the tournament semifinals. Shiratori utilized his length to keep Santiago at bay through the first half of the fight, while Santiago managed to push into the pocked and land with more frequency in the second half of the fight. They went into an extra extension round, as the fight was ruled a draw following the first three, after which Shiratori won by unanimous decision.

Shiratori was scheduled to fight Hiroto Yamaguchi at Rizin FF 16 on June 2, 2019. He won the fight by unanimous decision.

Shiratori faced Saeksan Or. Kwanmuang in the semifinals of the 2019 RISE World Series on July 21, 2019. The two-time Rajadamnern Stadium lightweight champion advanced to the tournament semifinals after defeating Taiga Kawabe by unanimous decision. Shiratori completely dominated Saeksan, knocking him down in both the second and third round. He won by a wide unanimous decision, with scores of 30–26, 30-25 and 30–25.

Advancing to the tournament finals, Shiratori faced Genji Umeno on September 16, 2019. He knocked Umeno out with a left straight at the very end of the first round.

Taiga duology
Although he wasn't able to fight Taiga Kawabe during the RISE World Series, Shiratori was scheduled to fight the former K-1 Featherweight champion at Rizin 19 on October 12, 2019. Shitari came into the bout riding a nine-fight winning streak, while Taiga came into the bout with only a single win in past seven fights. Shiratori knocked Taiga down in both the first and second rounds, while Taiga managed to mount a comeback in the third round. Despite this, Shiratori won the fight by unanimous decision.

They were scheduled to fight a rematch at Rizin 20 - Saitama on December 31, 2019. Shiratori won the fight by a second-round technical knockout. During the second round, Shiratori cut Taiga's face with a knee strike, which forced the ringside doctor to stop the fight in-between the rounds.

On July 21, 2020, Shiratori faced Sho Ogawa at Rise on Abema. He won the fight by an extra round unanimous decision. It was his last fight as the reigning champion, as he vacated the RISE Lightweight championship on August 1, 2020.

The losing skid
Shiratori participated in the 2020 RISE Dead of Alive 63 kg four man tournament, with the other three participants being Renta Nishioka, Naoki Tanaka and Kento Haraguchi. He was scheduled to fight Naoki Tanaka in the semifinals on October 11, 2020. Despite coming into the fight as a favorite, Shiratori would lose by a first-round technical knockout. Tanaka landed a knee to the forehead of Shiratori midway through the round, resulting in a cut which left Shiratori unable to continue. It was only the second kickboxing loss of his career.

Shiratori was scheduled to fight Kento Haraguchi at RISE Eldorado 2021 on February 28, 2021. He accepted the fight 24 days before the event, as a short notice replacement for Petpanomrung Kiatmuu9, who was unable to enter Japan due to the COVID-19 restrictions. After an even first round, Haraguchi knocked Shiratori down twice in the second round. The first knockdown came as a result of a spinning hook kick, while the second knockdown was a result of a head kick. Haraguchi won the fight by unanimous decision.

Rizin KICK tournament
Shiratori took part in the 2021 Rizin KICK tournament, held during the Rizin 29 – Osaka event event on June 27, 2021. He was scheduled to fight Ryo Takahashi in the semifinals, while the other semifinal bout was contested by Koji and Genji Umeno. The event was originally scheduled for May 23, before being postponed due to the COVID-19 restrictions. Shiratori made quick work of Takahashi, knocking him down twice in the first round, with the referee stopping the fight following the second knockdown.

Advancing to the tournament finals, Shiratori met Koji. He won the fight by unanimous decision, with two of the judges scoring the fight 30-27 for him, while the third judge scored it 30–25 in his favor. Aside from winning the tournament title, Shiratori was also given ¥5,000,000 in prize money. During the post-fight interview, Shiratori stated his desire to fight Tenshin Nasukawa.

Return to RISE
Shiratori was scheduled to fight a rematch with Naoki Tanaka at RISE WORLD SERIES 2021 Yokohama on September 23, 2021. The two previously fought in the semifinals of the 2020 Rise Dead or Alive tournament, which Tanaka won by a first-round technical knockout. Shiratori lost the rematch by unanimous decision. He had a strong start to the fight, but flagged as the it went on, with the judges ruling the bout a draw after the first three rounds. Accordingly, an extra round was fought, which Shiratori lost on all three of the judges scorecards.

Shiratori was booked to face the three-time RISE lightweight title challenger Hideki at RISE El Dorado 2022 April 2, 2022. The bout was a rematch of their February 3, 2019 fight, which Shiratori won by a third-round technical knockout. Shiratori won the rematch by extra round unanimous decision.

Shiratori faced the one-time Krush Lightweight and K-1 World GP Lightweight Champion Kongnapa Weerasakreck at The Match 2022 on June 19, 2022. He lost the fight by a first-round knockout. Shiratori was knocked down with a right hook at the 2:42 minute mark of the opening round, and although he was able to beat the eight-count, the referee nonetheless decided to wave the bout off.

Move to super lightweight
Shiratori faced the tenth ranked RISE lightweight YA-MAN in a super lightweight (-65 kg) bout at RISE World Series 2022 on October 15, 2022. At the pre-fight press conference, Shiratori said he planned to fight at super lightweight from that point on. Shiratori won the fight by unanimous decision, with all three judges scoring the bout 29–28 in his favor. He knocked YA-MAN down with a high knee in the second round, which proved to be the deciding factor on the scorecards.

Shiratori was expected to face the Glory veteran Abdellah Ezbiri at RISE WORLD SERIES / SHOOTBOXING-KINGS on December 25, 2022. Ezbiri withdrew from the fight on December 22, and was replaced by Ilias Banniss. Shiratori won the fight by unanimous decision, with two scorecards of 30–27 and one scorecard of 30–28.

Shiratori faced the former two-weight Krush champion Daizo Sasaki at RISE ELDORADO 2023 on March 26, 2023.

Titles and accomplishments

Kickboxing
RISE
 2019 RISE World Series -61 kg Tournament Champion 
 2019 RISE Lightweight Champion (One time, former)
Rizin Fighting Federation
2021 Rizin KICK Tournament Winner

Muay Thai
World Professional Muaythai Federation
 2013 WPMF Japan Super Featherweight Champion

Amateur
RISE
2009 KAMINARIMON -50 kg Tournament Winner
Shin Karate
2010 All Japan Shin Karate K-3 Grand Prix Winner

Fight record

|- style="background:#;"
| 2023-03-26 || ||align=left| Daizo Sasaki || RISE ELDORADO 2023 || Tokyo, Japan || ||  ||
|-  style="background:#cfc;"
| 2022-12-25|| Win ||align=left| Ilias Banniss || RISE WORLD SERIES / Glory Rivals 4|| Tokyo, Japan || Decision (Unanimous) || 3 ||3:00
|-
|-  style="text-align:center; background:#cfc"
| 2022-10-15 || Win ||align=left| YA-MAN|| RISE World Series 2022 || Tokyo, Japan || Decision (Unanimous) || 3 || 3:00

|-  style="text-align:center; background:#fbb;"
| 2022-06-19 || Loss ||align=left| Kongnapa Weerasakreck || THE MATCH 2022 || Tokyo, Japan || KO (Right hook) || 1  || 2:42
|-  style="text-align:center; background:#cfc"
| 2022-04-02 || Win ||align=left| Hideki || RISE El Dorado 2022 || Tokyo, Japan || Ext. R. Decision (Unanimous) || 4 || 3:00
|-  style="text-align:center; background:#fbb;"
| 2021-09-23|| Loss ||align=left| Naoki Tanaka || RISE WORLD SERIES 2021 Yokohama || Yokohama, Japan || Ext. R. Decision (Unanimous) || 4 || 3:00
|-  style="text-align:center; background:#cfc;"
| 2021-06-27|| Win ||align=left| Kouzi || Rizin 29 – Osaka, Tournament Final || Osaka, Japan || Decision (Unanimous) || 3 ||3:00
|-
! style=background:white colspan=9 |
|-  style="text-align:center; background:#cfc;"
| 2021-06-27|| Win ||align=left| Ryo Takahashi || Rizin 29 – Osaka, Tournament Semifinal || Osaka, Japan || TKO (Punches)|| 1 || 1:37
|-  style="text-align:center; background:#fbb;"
| 2021-02-28 || Loss || align=left| Kento Haraguchi || RISE Eldorado 2021 || Yokohama, Japan || Decision (Unanimous)  || 3 || 3:00
|-  style="text-align:center; background:#fbb;"
| 2020-10-11||Loss ||align=left| Naoki Tanaka || RISE DEAD OR ALIVE 2020 Yokohama, Semi Final||  Yokohama, Japan || TKO (Doctor Stoppage) || 1 || 1:30
|-  style="text-align:center; background:#cfc;"
| 2020-07-21|| Win ||align=left| Sho Ogawa || Rise on Abema || Tokyo, Japan || Ext.R Decision (Unanimous) || 4 || 3:00
|-  style="text-align:center; background:#CCFFCC;"
| 2019-12-31|| Win ||align=left| Taiga || Rizin 20 - Saitama || Saitama, Japan || TKO (Doctor Stoppage/cut) || 2 || 3:00
|-  style="text-align:center; background:#CCFFCC;"
| 2019-10-12|| Win||align=left| Taiga|| Rizin 19 - Osaka|| Osaka, Japan|| Decision (Unanimous) || 3 || 3:00
|-  style="text-align:center; background:#CCFFCC;"
| 2019-09-16||Win ||align=left| Genji Umeno || Rise World Series 2019 Final, -61 kg Tournament final || Chiba (city), Japan || KO (Straight Left) || 1 || 2:59
|-
! style=background:white colspan=9 |
|-  style="text-align:center; background:#CCFFCC;"
| 2019-07-21 || Win ||align=left| Saeksan Or. Kwanmuang || Rise World Series 2019 : Semi Finals, -61 kg Tournament Semi final || Osaka, Japan || Decision (Unanimous) || 3 || 3:00
|-  style="text-align:center; background:#CCFFCC;"
| 2019-06-02|| Win ||align=left| Hiroto Yamaguchi || Rizin FF 16 || Kobe, Japan || Decision (Unanimous)|| 3 || 3:00
|-  style="text-align:center; background:#CCFFCC;"
| 2019-03-10|| Win ||align=left| Hector Santiago || RISE World Series 2019: First Round, -61 kg Tournament Quarter Final || Tokyo, Japan || Ext.R Decision (Unanimous) || 4 || 3:00
|-  style="text-align:center; background:#CCFFCC;"
| 2019-02-03|| Win ||align=left| Hideki || RISE 130 || Tokyo, Japan || TKO (Doctor Stoppage) || 3 || 1:41 
|-
! style=background:white colspan=9 |
|-  style="text-align:center; background:#CCFFCC;"
| 2018-12-31|| Win ||align=left| Yoshiya Uzatsuyo || Rizin - Heisei's Last Yarennoka! || Tokyo, Japan || KO (Right knee) || 3 || 1:43
|-  style="text-align:center; background:#CCFFCC;"
| 2018-11-17|| Win ||align=left| Tomohiro Kitai || RISE 129 || Tokyo, Japan ||  Decision || 3 || 3:00
|-  style="text-align:center; background:#CCFFCC;"
| 2018-09-16|| Win ||align=left| Masanori Shimada || RISE 127 || Tokyo, Japan ||  KO (Left high kick)|| 1 || 1:38
|-  style="text-align:center; background:#CCFFCC;"
| 2018-06-17|| Win ||align=left| Kazuma || RISE 125 || Tokyo, Japan ||  KO (Straight Left)|| 1 || 2:59
|-  style="text-align:center; background:#FFBBBB;"
| 2014-07-13|| Loss ||align=left| Tsuyoshi M16 Muaythaistyle || Muay Lok 2014 -2nd- || Tokyo, Japan ||  TKO (Doctor Stoppage/Elbow) || 4 || 2:23
|-  style="text-align:center; background:#FFBBBB;"
| 2014-04-27|| Loss ||align=left| Seo Dong Pong || Muay Lok 2014 -1st- || Tokyo, Japan ||  TKO (Three knockdowns) || 3 || 0:48
|-  style="text-align:center; background:#CCFFCC;"
| 2013-12-01|| Win ||align=left| Takahito Fujimaki || M-FIGHT The Battle of Muaythai III || Yokohama, Japan || Decision (Unanimous) || 5 || 3:00 
|-
! style=background:white colspan=9 |
|-  style="text-align:center; background:#CCFFCC;"
| 2013-09-08|| Win ||align=left| Takuro || M-FIGHT The Battle of Muaythai II || Tokyo, Japan || Ext.R Decision (Majority)|| 4 || 3:00
|-  style="text-align:center; background:#CCFFCC;"
| 2013-08-10|| Win ||align=left| Klasik Sitchansing || Lumpinee Stadium || Bangkok, Thailand || KO || 1 ||
|-  style="text-align:center; background:#c5d2ea;"
| 2013-04-28|| Draw ||align=left| Em Rajasaklek || Muay Lok 2013 -ist- || Tokyo, Japan || Decision || 3 || 3:00
|-  style="text-align:center; background:#FFBBBB;"
| 2012-10-21|| Loss ||align=left| Takuro || Muay Lok 2012 -3rd- || Tokyo, Japan || TKO || 2 || 0:21
|-  style="text-align:center; background:#CCFFCC;"
| 2012-07-29|| Win ||align=left| Daichi Kurashina || REBELS.12, Tournament Final || Tokyo, Japan || Decision (Unanimous) || 3 || 3:00
|-
! style=background:white colspan=9 |
|-  style="text-align:center; background:#CCFFCC;"
| 2012-06-17|| Win ||align=left| Yuta Tokuyama || Muay Lok 2012 -2nd- || Tokyo, Japan || KO (Left High Kick)|| 1 || 0:35
|-  style="text-align:center; background:#CCFFCC;"
| 2012-03-25|| Win ||align=left| Fumiya Iwashita || M-1 Muay Thai Challenge Sutt Yod Muaythai vol.1 Part 1, Tournament Semifinal || Tokyo, Japan || TKO || 1 || 3:00
|-  style="text-align:center; background:#FFBBBB;"
| 2012-02-19|| Loss ||align=left| Takuya Saito || J-NETWORK J-FIGHT in SHINJUKU -vol.24- || Tokyo, Japan || KO || 3 || 2:50
|-  style="text-align:center; background:#CCFFCC;"
| 2011-08-07|| Win ||align=left| Rukiya Anpo || Muay Lok 2011 -3rd- || Tokyo, Japan || Decision (Unanimous) || 3 || 3:00
|-  style="text-align:center; background:#CCFFCC;"
| 2011-04-02 || Win ||align=left| Piero Otsuka || Muay Lok 2011 -2nd- || Tokyo, Japan || Decision (Unanimous)|| 3 || 3:00
|-  style="text-align:center; background:#FFBBBB;"
| 2011-02-20 || Loss ||align=left| Shogun || Muay Lok 2011 -1st- || Tokyo, Japan || Decision (Unanimous) || 3 || 3:00
|-
| colspan=9 | Legend:    

|-  style="background:#cfc;"
| 2010-07-11||Win ||align=left| Kaiji Togura || J-NETWORK J-GROW 34||  Tokyo, Japan || KO || 1 || 0:56
|-  style="background:#fbb;"
| 2009-11-29||Loss||align=left| Shogo Kondo || KAMINARIMON||  Tokyo, Japan || Decision  ||  || 
|-
! style=background:white colspan=9 |
|-  style="background:#cfc;"
| 2009-10-25||Win ||align=left| Shinichiro Fukuda || KAMINARIMON, Final||  Tokyo, Japan || Decision (Unanimous) || 1 || 2:00
|-  style="background:#cfc;"
| 2009-10-25||Win ||align=left| Tokio Yachuda || KAMINARIMON, Semi Final||  Tokyo, Japan || Decision (Unanimous) || 1 || 1:00
|-
| colspan=9 | Legend:

Boxing record

|- 
|-
|11
|Loss
|8–3
|style="text-align:left;"| Izuki Tomioka
|
|8 (8), ||
|11 November 2017
|style="text-align:left;"| 
|style="text-align:left;"|
|-
|10
|Win
|8–2
|style="text-align:left;"| Prell Tupas
|
|7 (8), || 
|13 June 2017
|style="text-align:left;"| 
|
|-
|9
|Win
|7–2
|style="text-align:left;"| Jamjut Saithonggym
|
|2 (6), || 
|10 March 2017
|style="text-align:left;"| 
|
|-
|8
|Win
|6–2
|style="text-align:left;"| Masaharu Hanaka
|
|1 (6), || 
|24 December 2016
|style="text-align:left;"| 
|
|-
|7
|Loss
|5–2
|style="text-align:left;"| Akira Morita	
|
|3 (4), || 
|21 July 2016
|style="text-align:left;"| 
|
|-
|6
|Win
|5–1
|style="text-align:left;"| George Tachibana
|
|4 (4), || 
|31 May 2016
|style="text-align:left;"| 
|
|-
|5
|Win
|4–1
|style="text-align:left;"| Kingpetch Sor Kingpetch
|
|4 (4), || 
|28 March 2016
|style="text-align:left;"| 
|
|-
|4
|Win
|3–1
|style="text-align:left;"| Tomoki Takada
|
|1 (4), || 
|27 January 2016
|style="text-align:left;"| 
|
|-
|3
|Loss
|2–1
|style="text-align:left;"| Kosuke Arioka
|
|3 (4), || 
|11 November 2015
|style="text-align:left;"| 
|
|-
|2
|Win
|2–0
|style="text-align:left;"| Ryo Nakano
|
|4 (4), || 
|7 August 2015
|style="text-align:left;"| 
|
|-
|1
|Win
|1–0
|style="text-align:left;"| Nao Sugawara
|
|1 (4), || 
|6 May 2015
|style="text-align:left;"| 
|
|-
| colspan=10 |  Legend:

See also
 List of male kickboxers

References

Living people
1996 births
Japanese male kickboxers
Japanese Muay Thai practitioners
Japanese male boxers
Bantamweight kickboxers
Lightweight boxers
Sportspeople from Tokyo